Jerome John McGann (born July 22, 1937) is an American academic and textual scholar whose work focuses on the history of literature and culture from the late eighteenth century to the present.

Career

Educated at Le Moyne College (B.S. 1959), Syracuse University (M.A. 1962) and Yale University (Ph.D., 1966), McGann currently teaches at the University of Virginia (1986–present), where he arrived after leaving Caltech.

McGann is a member of the American Philosophical Society and the American Academy of Arts and Sciences and has received honorary doctoral degrees from University of Chicago (1996) and University of Athens (2009). Other awards include: Melville Cane Award, American Poetry Society, 1973, for his work on Swinburne as "The Year's Best Critical Book about Poetry"; Distinguished Scholar Award from the Keats-Shelley Association of America (1989); Distinguished Scholar Award from the Byron Society of America, 1989; and the Wilbur Cross Medal, Yale University Graduate School, 1994.

In 2002 he was the recipient of three major awards: the Richard W. Lyman Award for Distinguished Contributions to Humanities Computing, National Humanities Center (first award recipient); the James Russell Lowell Prize (from the Modern Language Association) for Radiant Textuality as the Most Distinguished Scholarly Book of the Year; and the Mellon Foundation Distinguished Achievement Award.

He has been a Fulbright Fellow (1965–66), an American Philosophical Society Fellow (1967) and Guggenheim Fellow (1970–71, 1976–77) and has been awarded NEH grants in 1975–76, 1987–89, 2003–2006, as well as grants from the Getty Foundation, the Delmas Foundation, and the Mellon Foundation. He has held more than a dozen other appointments, including President, Society for Textual Scholarship, 1995–1997; and President, Society for Critical Exchange, 2005–6.  Since 1999 he has been a senior research fellow, Institute of English Studies, University of London and since 2000 a senior research fellow, University College, London.

Academic work

McGann's first works of consequence were two books he published in 1983, The Romantic Ideology and A Critique of Modern Textual Criticism. Each defined the two large fields that have organized all his work, Romanticism (broadly conceived as an ongoing cultural enterprise) and Textual Studies.  The Critique was the forecast of the work in Digital Humanities (DH) that he began undertaking in the early 1990s when he helped found the Institute for Advanced Technology in the Humanities (IATH) at U. of Virginia, an initiative that probably had more influence than any other in shaping the course of Digital Humanities in the United States.  Extrapolating the implications of his experimental editorial project The Rossetti Archive (1993–2008), McGann has published a large body of work -- it is ongoing -- on DH theory and method.  Since the turn of the century that work became part of the broad argument he has developed for the pertinence of philological and historical method in literary and cultural studies. McGann has also written six books of poetry including Air Heart Sermons (1976) and Four Last Poems (1996), both published by Pasdeloup Press in Canada. In 1993, McGann began . He is also the founder of the Applied Research in Patacriticism digital laboratory, which includes such software projects as IVANHOE and NINES.

Personal life

McGann has been married since 1960 (to Anne Lanni) and has three children (born 1963, 1965, 1967)

External links
 NINES website
 Jerome McGann Homepage

Selected bibliography
Fiery Dust: Byron's Poetic Development. University of Chicago Press, 1969
Swinburne: An Experiment in Criticism. University of Chicago Press, 1972
The Romantic Ideology: A Critical Investigation. University of Chicago Press, 1983
A Critique of Modern Textual Criticism. University of Chicago Press, 1983
The Beauty of Inflections: Literary Investigations in Historical Method and Theory. Clarendon Press, 1985
Social Values and Poetic Acts. Harvard University Press, 1987
Towards a Literature of Knowledge. Oxford University Press and University of Chicago Press, 1989
The Textual Condition. Princeton University Press, 1991
Black Riders: The Visible Language of Modernism. Princeton University Press, 1993
Byron: The Complete Poetical Works, ed. with Introduction, Apparatus, and Commentaries. 7 Vols. Clarendon Press, The Oxford English Texts series, 1980–1993
Poetics of Sensibility. A Revolution in Literary Style. Oxford University Press, 1996
Dante Gabriel Rossetti and the Game that Must be Lost. Yale University Press, 2000
Radiant Textuality. Literature Since the World Wide Web. Palgrave/St Martins, 2001
Byron and Romanticism. Cambridge University Press, 2002
Algernon Charles Swinburne. Major Poems and Selected Prose. Yale University Press, 2004
The Scholar's Art. Literary Studies in a Managed World. University of Chicago Press, 2006
The Point is to Change It. Poetry and Criticism in the Continuing Present. University of Alabama Press, 2007
Stephen Crane's The Black Riders and other lines, ed. with Afterword. Rice University Press, Literature by Design series, 2009
Byron's Manfred.  Pasdeloup Press, 2009
Are the Humanities Inconsequent? An Interpretation of Marx's Riddle of the Dog. Prickly Paradigm Press, 2009
Online Humanities Scholarship.  The Shape of Things to Come, ed. with an Introduction.  Rice University Press, 2010
A New Republic of Letters: Memory and Scholarship in the Age of Digital Reproduction. Harvard University Press, 2014
The Poet Edgar Allan Poe: Alien Angel. Harvard University Press, 2014
Keats and the Historical Method in Literary Criticism. Modern Language Notes 94.5 (1979): 988–1032

References

Living people
1937 births
Romanticism
Romantic poets
Lord Byron
Duke University faculty
University of Virginia faculty
Le Moyne College alumni
Syracuse University alumni
Yale University alumni
Textual criticism
Textual scholarship